Asteroma caryae is a plant pathogen that causes liver spot disease of pecan.

References

External links 
 Index Fungorum
 USDA ARS Fungal Database

Diaporthales
Fungal plant pathogens and diseases
Nut tree diseases